Tomislav Višević (born December 9, 1980 in Karlsruhe, West Germany) is a Bosnian Croat retired footballer defender.

Club career
During his career he played for clubs from Croatia, Bosnia and Herzegovina, Azerbaijan, Ukraine and Poland.

External links 
 
 

1980 births
Living people
Footballers from Karlsruhe
German people of Croatian descent
Croats of Bosnia and Herzegovina
Association football defenders
Bosnia and Herzegovina footballers
HNK Cibalia players
HŠK Posušje players
FC Metalurh Zaporizhzhia players
FC Metalurh-2 Zaporizhzhia players
Neftçi PFK players
AZAL PFK players
Zagłębie Lubin players
NK Osijek players
NK Vinogradar players
Croatian Football League players
Premier League of Bosnia and Herzegovina players
Ukrainian Premier League players
Ukrainian Second League players
Azerbaijan Premier League players
Ekstraklasa players
First Football League (Croatia) players
Bosnia and Herzegovina expatriate footballers
Expatriate footballers in Croatia
Bosnia and Herzegovina expatriate sportspeople in Croatia
Expatriate footballers in Ukraine
Bosnia and Herzegovina expatriate sportspeople in Ukraine
Expatriate footballers in Azerbaijan
Bosnia and Herzegovina expatriate sportspeople in Azerbaijan
Expatriate footballers in Poland
Bosnia and Herzegovina expatriate sportspeople in Poland